KQMY (102.1 FM) is an American radio station licensed to Paia, Hawaii.

The station was assigned the KMKV call letters by the Federal Communications Commission on January 2, 2013. The station changed its call sign to the current KQMY on July 1, 2017.

References

External links

QMY (FM)
Radio stations established in 2008
2008 establishments in Hawaii
Classic hits radio stations in the United States